VCY America, is a traditional, evangelical, conservative Christian ministry based in Milwaukee, Wisconsin. The VCY America Radio Network maintains a format of Christian talk and teaching, as well as traditional Christian music through its broadcast outlets.

History
Originally known as "Milwaukee Youth For Christ," and later, "Greater Milwaukee Youth For Christ," it left the national YFC organization in 1973 and became known as the Wisconsin Voice of Christian Youth (WVCY) until 1995, when it changed to its present name. Its flagship stations in Milwaukee, WVCY-FM and WVCY-TV, share a call sign which refers to the ministry's original name.

Radio network

The ministry operates 35 VCY America-owned radio stations in Arizona, Colorado, Illinois, Iowa, Kansas, Michigan, Minnesota, Missouri, New Mexico, New York, Ohio, South Dakota, Texas, West Virginia, and Wisconsin.  It also broadcasts over 25 low-power FM translators. VCY America radio also provides programming such as Crosstalk, Worldview Weekend, and Music 'til Dawn to stations throughout the country via satellite. Additionally, VCY has a Christian bookstore in Wauwatosa, Wisconsin which is promoted on air and ships throughout the United States as an additional source of revenue.

VCY attempted to expand into the San Francisco Bay Area, Las Vegas, and the Coachella Valley through the lease and attempted purchase of a group of three stations in a bankruptcy action: KFRH, KREV and KRCK-FM. In early 2022, the original owner sued successfully to nullify the bankruptcy action against them, and the bankruptcy debtor in possession and trustee was forced to return to the stations to them and nullify the VCY America leases. As of March 2023, the stations are back in trustee control, with a possibility of a sale to VCY America still being considered.

In December 2022 VCY America announced it would purchase WFAS-FM in the New York City area from Cumulus Media, pending final approval from the Federal Communications Commission.RadioInsight.com "VCY America Enters New York City with WFAS-FM Purchase Dec. 8, 2022  Renamed WVBN, the acquisition, completed on February 6, 2023, gave VCY America its first broadcast outlet on the East Coast.

Programming
VCY America's radio programming includes Christian talk and teaching programming, among them:

 Crosstalk, hosted by Jim Schneider, with past Vic Eliason-hosted episodes also aired
 Worldview Weekend with Brannon Howse
 Grace to You with John MacArthur
 In Touch with Charles Stanley
 Love Worth Finding with Adrian Rogers
 Revive Our Hearts with Nancy DeMoss Wolgemuth
 The Alternative with Tony Evans
 Liberty Counsel's Faith and Freedom Report
 Thru the Bible with J. Vernon McGee
 Joni and Friends with Joni Eareckson Tada
 Unshackled!
 Moody Radio's Stories of Great Christians

VCY America also airs a variety of vocal and instrumental traditional Christian music, as well as children's programming such as Ranger Bill. Notably, the network (including WVCY-TV) eschews any programs featuring Contemporary Christian music, and has dropped programming which has switched to it in any form, including as theme music.

Television
The ministry also owns WVCY-TV (Channel 30) in Milwaukee, which holds a commercial license but is completely viewer supported. As of January 2018, it is carried under a channel share agreement with commercial station WITI, owned by Fox Television Stations.  It vacated its former independent frequency in the FCC's spectrum repack auction, the proceeds of which ($76.3 million, plus donations and bookstore purchases since) have been utilized to expand VCY's radio network. WVCY-TV is also carried in the Wausau television market via translator W26EE-D, licensed to Wittenburg. 

In 1994, WVCY-TV rejected an offer to be purchased by CBS and become the network's new Milwaukee affiliate, following WITI's defection to Fox as part of the 1994–1996 United States broadcast television realignment.

Other efforts
The ministry also operates a summer camp, near Hillsboro, Wisconsin, called, "Trail Ridge Camp" as well as its religious bookstore, with a physical location in Wauwatosa, a suburb of Milwaukee, and its online presence.

Leadership
The ministry is run by a team formerly headed by the late Vic Eliason, a former Youth for Christ worker, ordained Christian minister and a recipient of an honorary doctorate from Bob Jones University, in 2001.  Jim Schneider is the current Executive Director.

List of stations

Notes:

References

External links

American radio networks
Christian radio stations in the United States
Radio broadcasting companies of the United States
VCY America stations